Middaugh is a surname. Notable people with the surname include:

Bud Middaugh (born c. 1939), American baseball coach
Sherry Middaugh (born 1966), Canadian curler
Tuesday Middaugh (born 1973), American synchronized swimmer
Wayne Middaugh (born 1967), Canadian curler

See also
Henry C. Middaugh House
Middaugh-Stone House and Dutch Barn